Scarborough is a surname of English origin. Notable people with the surname include:

 Adrian Scarborough (born 1968), English actor
 Andrew Scarborough (born 1973), English actor
 Chuck Scarborough (born 1943), American television news anchor
 David Scarboro (1968–1988), English actor (EastEnders)
 Edmund Scarborough (c.1617–1671), Virginia politician, soldier and landowner
 Edmund Scarborough (born 1840 ), Mississippi politician, minister and farmer
 Elizabeth Ann Scarborough (born 1947), American fantasy/science fiction writer
 George Scarborough (1859–1900), an American Western lawman and outlaw
 Joe Scarborough (born 1938),  English painter of humorous scenes of the life and people in South Yorkshire
 Joe Scarborough (born 1963), American politician, cable TV news personality, and musician
 Kelvin Scarborough (1964–2020), American baseball player
 Lee Rutland Scarborough (1870–1945), American Southern Baptist pastor
 Robert H. Scarborough (1923–2020) United States Coast Guard vice admiral
 William Sanders Scarborough (1852–1926), American classics scholar
 Eve Scarborough (born 1999), a subject of the BBC documentary film series Child of Our Time

Scarboro
 Harold Scarboro (died 1944), American politician and newspaper editor

See also
 Earl of Scarbrough